The mitred horseshoe bat (Rhinolophus mitratus) is a species of bat in the family Rhinolophidae. It is endemic to India. Little is known about the species, because it is known only from the holotype, the specimen used to describe the species to science. The specimen was collected in Jharkhand in 1844.

References

Rhinolophidae
Bats of India
Endemic fauna of India
Mammals described in 1844
Taxa named by Edward Blyth
Taxonomy articles created by Polbot